The phrase Outer Coastal Plain can refer to:

 Outer Coastal Plain (physiographic province), a geological region of New Jersey in the United States.
 Outer Coastal Plain AVA, a wine region in New Jersey recognized  as an American Viticultural Area.